Daniel Marques may refer to:

 Daniel Marques (Brazilian footballer) (born 1983), Brazilian football centre-back
 Daniel Marques (Portuguese footballer) (born 1987), Portuguese football defender

See also
 Daniel Marquis (1829–1879), Australian portrait photographer
 Daniel Márquez (born 1987), Mexican football forward